Stacyville may refer to:

Stacyville, Iowa
Stacyville, Maine